Peter Murnane (born 5 February 1955) is a former Australian rules footballer who played with Hawthorn in the VFL.

Murnane played mostly as a wingman and half forward and was a two-time premiership winner at Hawthorn, the first in his debut season. Recruited from De La Salle, he spent six seasons with Hawthorn and managed 80 games.

Later life
Murnane worked as a physical education teacher at Ballarat Clarendon College.

References

1955 births
Living people
Hawthorn Football Club players
Hawthorn Football Club Premiership players
De La Salle OC Amateur Football Club players
Australian rules footballers from Victoria (Australia)
Two-time VFL/AFL Premiership players